Argo is an unincorporated community and census-designated place (CDP) in Scott County, Iowa, United States.

Argo was first listed as a CDP prior to the 2020 census.

Demographics

History
Argo was originally known as Porter's Corners, but by the turn of the century, the name Argo had supplanted the original name. Argo's population was 71 in 1902, and 35 in 1925.

References 

Census-designated places in Scott County, Iowa
Census-designated places in Iowa